Moto Grosso Feio is the thirteenth album by Wayne Shorter, recorded in 1970 but not released on the Blue Note label until 1974. The album features four originals by Shorter and an arrangement of "Vera Cruz" by Milton Nascimento. Some of the musicians include guitarist John McLaughlin, bassist/cellist Ron Carter, bassist Dave Holland, percussionist Airto and drummers Jack DeJohnette and Micheline Pelzer.

Reception
The AllMusic review by Scott Yanow awarded the album 3 stars, stating that "the music (which is influenced by early fusion) has its interesting moments although it often wanders".

Track listing 
All compositions by Wayne Shorter except where noted.

 "Moto Grosso Feio" – 12:30
 "Montezuma" – 7:53
 "Antigua" – 5:25
 "Vera Cruz" (Milton Nascimento) – 5:12
 "Iska" – 11:22

Personnel 
 Wayne Shorter — soprano saxophone, tenor saxophone
 John McLaughlin — 12-string guitar
 Chick Corea — marimba, drums, percussion
 Ron Carter — bass, cello
 Dave Holland — acoustic guitar, bass
 Jack DeJohnette — drums, thumb piano
 Miroslav Vitouš — bass (uncredited on album cover but mentioned as part of sessions in liner notes)
 Micheline Pelzer (credited as Michelin Prell) — drums, percussion

References

External links 
 Wayne Shorter - Moto Grosso Feio (rec. 1970, rel. 1974) album releases & credits at Discogs
 Wayne Shorter - Moto Grosso Feio (rec. 1970, rel. 1974) album to be listened on Spotify

1974 albums
Blue Note Records albums
Wayne Shorter albums
Albums produced by Duke Pearson